Herriko Alderdi Sozialista (HAS) was a revolutionary socialist Basque political party, with presence only in the French Basque Country.

History
HAS was founded in 1974 in Bayonne by ex-members of Enbata, a Basque nationalist organization banned in January of the same year by the French president Georges Pompidou. One of the main goals of HAS was to give support to the independentist struggle in the Southern Basque Country and to organize mobilizations of support to the Basque prisoners and to the ETA(m) militants that were being judged in the Process of Burgos.

References

Defunct communist parties in the Basque Country (autonomous community)
Communist parties in France
Basque nationalism
Anti-Francoism
1974 establishments in France
Political parties established in 1974
1975 disestablishments in France
Political parties disestablished in 1975